The women's 3000 metres event at the 1978 Commonwealth Games was held on 7 August at the Commonwealth Stadium in Edmonton, Alberta, Canada. It was the first time that this event was held at the Commonwealth Games.

Results

References

Final results (The Canberra Times)
Australian results

Athletics at the 1978 Commonwealth Games
1978